Zemeh (also Romanized as Z̄emeh) is a village in Oshnavieh-ye Shomali Rural District, in the Central District of Oshnavieh County, West Azerbaijan Province, Iran. At the 2006 census, its population was 335, in 52 families.

References 

Populated places in Oshnavieh County